Order of the Black Eagle may refer to:

Awards and decorations
Order of the Black Eagle, a Prussian knighthood rank established in 1701.
Order of the Black Eagle, Albania, a civil award used by the short-lived Principality of Albania in 1913-1914.

Fictional creations
Order of the Black Eagle, a 1987 American action movie.